Attack Pro Wrestling (stylized as ATTACK! Pro Wrestling) is a Welsh professional wrestling promotion owned and operated by wrestler Mark Andrews

Although ATTACK was originally established in 2011 by wrestler Pete Dunne and ring announcer Jim Lee, from February 2012 the promotion became solely owned by Dunne (when Jim stepped-down as co-owner/promoter), with the events managed by a regularly-changing collective of British wrestlers in the subsequent years (including Dunne, Andrews and Chris Brookes). Mark Andrews then assumed ownership and sole control of the promotion in January 2023.

It was nominated for the award of "UK/Ireland Promotion of the Year" at the Fighting Spirit Magazine Readers Awards 2016.

Style 

The promotion is known for combining high-quality independent wrestling with "some of the most creative shows the British Wrestling scene has ever seen"; including innovative themed shows (such as the video game themed show 'Press Start'), unique characters (such as an amorous French mouse named 'Love Making Demon'), and bizarre twists (such as referees and soft toys winning Championship belts).

History

Formation & 2011 
Attack! Pro Wrestling was founded in 2011 by Pete Dunne and Jim Lee. Having originally met at a wrestling training school in Coventry in 2006, the duo founded Attack! as a means to create more exposure for their group of friends on the British independent wrestling scene, at a time when Pete and his contemporaries (such as Mark Andrews and Eddie Dennis) were first starting to gain work around the United Kingdom. Using primarily upcoming British junior heavyweight wrestlers, their concept was to showcase internationally influenced "fast-paced, hard-hitting" independent wrestling, with a unique creative approach.

The first events were held in August 2011, in community centre venues in Pete's hometown of Birmingham. The debut weekend was originally planned to consist of three shows, but was reduced to two shows at short notice, after one of the venues was damaged in the 2011 England Riots. The events featured a roster of wrestlers entirely from Pete and Jim's immediate circle of friends, and was headlined by the first "Elder Stein Invitational Tournament", which was won by Mark Andrews (overcoming Pete in the final). Attack returned for three further events in Birmingham in November 2011, which included Zack Sabre Jr's first appearances for the promotion.

2012–2014 

In February 2012, Attack held an event for the first time in Cardiff, with Mark Andrews joining Pete and Jim in organising events. The show was held at Cathays Community Centre; a venue of nostalgic relevance to the group (as many years previously Pete, Jim and Mark used to set up a re-purposed boxing ring to practice in the hall during the school holidays). The show was titled "We Do It For The Money, Obviously", as a dig at existing promoters from the region who had tried to stop the event going ahead, and was held in aid of local charity Recovery Cymru. The sold-out event was headlined by Pete Dunne vs Mark Andrews; an encounter which would be repeated many times over at Attack in the following years. Jim Lee stepped down from his position as Attack co-promoter after the event as a result of other commitments, handing control to Pete and Mark alone.

In December 2012, Attack also began to run shows in Bristol, with local wrestler Sebastian Radclaw temporarily joining the promoting team to help arrange events in the city. Bristol has since been Attack's second most-frequent show location, after Cardiff.

Attack continued to hold regular events in Cardiff, where they became known for hosting innovative 'themed' wrestling shows. Beginning with a Halloween-themed event named 'GooseBUMPS' in October 2012 (in which Pete Dunne defeated Eddie Dennis to win the second annual Elder Stein Invitational Tournament), the themed events then came to prominence in February 2013 with the video-game-themed event, Press Start. The Press Start event involved members of the Attack roster in video game fancy dress; including the Hunter Brothers as the Mario Bros., Mark Andrews as Pikachu, and Ryan Smile & Eddie Dennis as Sonic & Knuckles. The DVD trailer went viral, originally amassing over 32,000 views; exposing Attack! Pro Wrestling to a much wider audience than before.

Further themed shows since have included "Stiffler's House Party" (based on teen comedy movies), "We're Gonna Need A Bigger Boat" (a beach/nautical-themed show, featuring former ROH Wrestling TV & World Champion Jay Lethal), "Under The MistleTour" (Attack's yearly festive-themed shows), "Not Another SUPER Show" (with a superhero and supervillain theme), and "Now That's What I Call Wrestling! 37" (a pop music themed show). Wrestlers and fans regularly dress up at the shows, with prizes given to the best costumes.

In December 2013, Attack! introduced the Attack! Pro Wrestling 24/7 Championship as their first championship title. The wrestler holding the belt can be pinned or submitted at any time, which has resulted in the belt changing hands frequently; occasionally between shows. The first winner was Sebastian Radclaw, who won the title in a TLC match at Under The MistleTour 2013 Night One, in the final of the third Elder Stein Invitational. Radclaw would lose the title shortly after the conclusion of the show, before winning it back at Under The MistleTour 2013 Night Two, then losing it again almost immediately to Referee Chris Roberts. In total, there were 16 different Championship reigns between the title's introduction on 20 December 2013 and the end of that calendar year.

2015 

Over time, Attack! Pro Wrestling have increasingly incorporated long-term story arcs into their events. The most notable story to-date has involved the dominance of Pete Dunne's heel persona, which began in January 2015, at a show titled "Mandrews Goes To America". The show was styled as a farewell to Mark Andrews, who was set to leave the United Kingdom having signed a contract with TNA Wrestling. Mark faced long-time friend Pete Dunne in the main event, in a face vs face encounter; only for Pete to unexpectedly Attack Mark at the conclusion of the match. This was the launchpad for Pete's "Young & Bitter" persona, and later, his "Bruiserweight" persona. Pete went on to win the Attack! 24/7 Championship at the following event, "Attack! Wrestling To Make Love To" on 14 February 2015. His unprecedented dominance over the championship would remain a primary story device for 2015 and 2016.

February 2015 also saw Attack! Pro Wrestling run a series of events in conjunction with Pontins Holiday Parks, across five consecutive days.

Attack! introduced a Tag Team Championship for the first time in March 2015, with 'Wonderland of Wrestle' (Super Santos Sr & Elephant Mask) defeating the 'Anti-Fun Police' in the final of a Championship Tournament to become inaugural champions. The pair would hold the championships for almost the entirety of 2015.

In April 2015, American independent wrestling promotion Chikara invited Attack! Pro Wrestling to host a pre-show event before the Cardiff leg of their UK tour. The two promotions have maintained a friendship since, with Chikara publicly endorsing Attack! Pro Wrestling on a number of occasions.

For much of the second half of 2015, Eddie Dennis would chase Pete Dunne for the Attack! Pro Wrestling 24/7 Championship, only for Pete Dunne to repeatedly dodge Eddie. Meanwhile, Wild Boar would go on an unbeaten streak for the entire year in the promotion. Both stories built to a crescendo at Under The MistleTour 2015, in December that year. At Under The MistleTour 2015 Night One, Wild Boar defeated Morgan Webster to win the 2015 Elder Stein Invitational Tournament, after which Eddie would defeat Pete to win the 24/7 Championship. Eddie immediately declared his intent to put his new title on the line against Wild Boar the following night, at Under The MistleTour 2015 Night Two; a match which Wild Boar won, to finish 2015 undefeated in Attack! and its 24/7 Champion. The Tag Team Championships also changed hands that evening, with Wonderland of Wrestle losing the titles of The Brothers of Construction (known elsewhere in the country as the Hunter Brothers).

2016 

After another handful of shows at Pontins to start 2016, Attack! then returned to one of its core venues of Cathays Community Centre on 17 January 2016, for an '80s-themed event named "It Was Acceptable In The 80's". The event saw a change of both championships again. The Brothers of Construction lost the Tag Team Championships to the team of #CCK (Chris Brookes & Mondai Lykos), before a duo of changes in the Attack! 24/7 Championship; with new champ Wild Boar losing the belt to Eddie Dennis, who would again lose it immediately to Pete Dunne.

By this stage, the story arc focused on the battle of the Attack! Pro Wrestling 24/7 Championship had become a three-way affair, with Eddie Dennis and Wild Boar both seeking to end Pete Dunne's largely uninterrupted hold on the title. It was announced that Attack! Pro Wrestling would hold their biggest event to date at Walkabout Cardiff on 3 April 2016, titled "How Do You Learn To Fall Off A 20ft Ladder?", which would be headlined by a Triple Threat match between the trio.

The sold-out event was later nominated by readers of Fighting Spirit Magazine in the category of "UK/Ireland Show of the Year" in the 2016 FSM Reader Awards, with Tyler Bate vs Travis Banks from the show also receiving a nomination for "UK/Ireland Match of the Year". During the show, the Anti-Fun Police team of Damian Dunne and Ryan Smile would split, after several weeks of dissent in the ranks; with Ryan turning face. The Tag Team Championship changed hands, with Bayside High (Mark Andrews & Nixon Newell defeating #CCK, before a main event in which Pete Dunne would defeat Wild Boar and Eddie Dennis to retain the Attack! 24/7 Championship. Following the conclusion of the match, Referee Shay Purser would unexpectedly pin Pete Dunne to win the Championship, with the pinfall counted by ring announcer Jim Lee. This would begin a major story arc of a rivalry between Pete and Jim for much of 2016.

At the following event, 'Press Start 4' on 3 June 2016, it was announced that Attack would crown an Attack! Pro Wrestling Champion for the first time, with a tournament to decide the winner. Two first-round matches were held that evening, with Eddie Dennis and Wild Boar advancing to the semi-finals, at the expense of Tyler Bate and Travis Banks respectively. At the conclusion of the show, Pete Dunne attacked Jim Lee from behind with a steel chair, after which Jim Lee announced via the Attack! Pro Wrestling Facebook page that he would be stepping down from his position as ring announcer with immediate effect. Attack! Pro Wrestling would later (kayfabe) suspend Pete Dunne for his actions.

The Attack! Pro Wrestling Championship Tournament continued at the next event on 1 July 2016, with Mike Bird advancing over Zack Sabre Jr, and Super Santos Sr advancing over Charlie Garrett. After the match, Santos would align himself with the Anti-Fun Police, renaming himself Los Federales Santos Sr.

Attack! Pro Wrestling returned to their largest venue, Walkabout Cardiff, on 21 August 2016, for an event named "(Thank God It's Not) WinterSlam". It was announced that the event would be headlined by a TLC Match for the Tag Team Championships, between holders Bayside High and challengers #CCK; and that Pete Dunne would have his suspension lifted at the event, where he would wrestle El Ligero. The event also featured Mike Bird and Eddie Dennis advancing through their semi-final matches in the Attack! Pro Wrestling Championship tournament, defeating Los Federales Santos Sr and Wild Boar respectively. Following Pete Dunne's match with El Ligeo, Pete began to assault referee Shay Purser, before former ring announcer Jim Lee (in attendance as a fan) jumped the barrier to fight Pete off; with Jim announcing that he was making his return to Attack! Pro Wrestling. The event concluded with #CCK winning the Tag Team Championships from Bayside High.

Over a series of events that followed, various elements of the Attack! Pro roster would align themselves with either Pete or Jim. Nixon Newell turned on tag team partner Mark Andrews at "Attack! Pro's Not Dead" in September 2016, aligning herself with Pete; setting in motion a series of events that would lead to the announcement of a five-vs-five elimination match at Attack! Pro Wrestling's return to Walkabout Cardiff in November 2016, titled "Seriously? Another PPV Tie-In Event". Jim's team, titled the #JimLeegion, included himself, Mark Andrews, Martin Kirby, El Ligero, and one mystery partner; whilst Pete Dunne's team was announced as himself, Nixon Newell, Chris Bookes, Mondai Lykos and one mystery partner. It was also announced that Eddie Dennis and Mike Bird would compete in the final of the Attack! Pro Wrestling Championship Tournament at the event.

The show, held on 20 November 2016, was opened with the match to crown the first-ever Attack! Pro Wrestling Champion, with Eddie Dennis overcoming Mike Bird to win the title. Following the match, Wild Boar would align himself with Mike Bird; forming a heel team known as "Bird + Boar", having previously appeared regularly together under the name at Insane Championship Wrestling. Ahead of the main event, an exchange in the ring between Pete Dunne and Jim Lee resulted in a stipulation for the match whereby the losing team's captain would need to leave Attack! Pro Wrestling for good. Jim Lee announced his team's mystery fifth member as Attack's regular referee Shay Purser; only for Shay to immediately turn heel by low-blowing Jim to align himself with Pete's team. Eddie Dennis would come out to become the new fifth member of the #JimLeegion as the match began. Gradual eliminations left Pete Dunne and Jim Lee as the two sole competitors remaining in the match, which concluded with Pete tapping out to Jim; ending his tenure in Attack! Pro Wrestling.

Attack! held their annual Under The MistleTour shows in December 2016, with Night One headlined by Eddie Dennis making his first successful Championship defence, defeating Damian Dunne. #CCK would also lose their Tag Team Championships at the event to the team of Bowl-a-Rama (Splits McPins & Lloyd Katt). The following night saw the conclusion of the long-running feud between Anti-Fun Police leader Damian Dunne and former member Ryan Smile; with Smile emerging victorious.

2017–2018 

Attack! Pro Wrestling began 2017 by co-promoting an event with Fight Club: Pro in Wolverhampton, titled "Attack! Club Pro: #Wrestlehouse". The event featured various members of the Attack! and Fight Club rosters in action, headlined by Dan Moloney & Pete Dunne (who, despite being banned from Attack, was permitted to compete due to being an active member of the Fight Club roster) vs Trent Seven & Tyler Bate; significant due to the fact that all four men were scheduled to compete in the WWE United Kingdom Championship Tournament one week later. Notably, the event would finish with an impromptu six-man tag-team match between #CCK & Referee Shay Purser vs Moustache Mountain & Referee Joel Allen. With no referees left in the building, a paying spectator named Warren was unexpectedly brought into the ring to referee the match. Joel Allen would win the Attack! 24/7 Championship at the end of the encounter, only for Moustache Mountain to assist Warren in then pinning Joel to win the belt.

In 2018, Attack held its first show in London with the 'Live At The Dome' from The Dome at Tufnell Park in London.

One of the biggest developments of the year mainly revolved around Nothing To Prove. They gained new additions with Love Making Demon turning on the fans and revealing himself as Chuck Mambo, as well as Eddie Dennis being revealed as the ringleader of the faction. Lloyd Katt also turned on his partner Splits McPins and at the end of the year retiring him in a career VS career match, resulting in this being the last ever match of Split McPins, who was revealed as Matt Horgan.

Nothing To Prove also feuded with the Anti-Fun Police, originally leading them disbanning for a majority of 2018. During the Under The MistleTour show, Damien challenged Eddie Dennis for the Attack! Championship with the added stipulations of the Anti-Fun Police being reinstated if he won the title, or him leaving Attack if his losing streak continued. During the match, Ryan Smile returned as part of the Anti-Fun Police and faced off Nothing to prove along with the rest of the AFP, leading to Dunne winning the championship once again and reinstating his stable.

Due to the restrictions of WWE NXT UK talent not being able to compete in most independent promotions at the end of the year, names like Pete Dunne, Tyler Bate and some other names linked with NXT UK would compete in their final matches during the Under The MistleTour 2018 shows. As such, Pete Dunne vacated the Attack! 24/7 Championship on the 15 December Cardiff show.

2019 
In 2019, the reformation of Nothing To Prove began as Chuck Mumbo broke away from the group, Drew Parker moved to Japan towards the middle of 2019 and Eddie Dennis stopped appearing regularly for Attack. However, a new Illuminati-themed stable known as 'The Kabal' soon took the mantle of the biggest antagonistic force. While no true head leader had been revealed, one of the more Protestant members named Musmortus won the 24/7 Championship on 7 April 2019 at My Sacrifice 3, while fan favourite Shay Purser revealed himself to be one of the key figure heads of the group, renaming himself to M. Shay Ultra and would then win the Attack! Championship on 14 July 2019 at the RaffleMania 3 show. Two other members of the Kabal named Asmodeus and Azaroth would chase after the Attack! Tag Team Championships around the same time. At the end of 2019, Shay Purser ended up turning against The Kabal and aligning to the side of good once more.

One side story to appear during many of the different shows throughout 2019 was the focus on other wrestling talent who would help out as ring crew during different Attack shows. These mostly featured Sid Oakley and Clay McLeod who were dubbed as the 'Ring Crew Express' while sometimes swapping one/both of the two out for someone else helping out at the show, such as August Jackson, Billy Haze and Tim Lee. They would usually face off against Experiment In Terror (ELIJAH & LK Mezinger), formerly of Nothing To Prove in defeat. However, during a story stift which saw LK Mezinger have interruptions of his old Bowl-a-Rama gimmick as Lloyd Katt, Oakley and McLeod would defeat Experiment in Terror at both RaffleMania shows in July 2019. Eventually, they would end up winning a shot at the Attack! Tag Team Championship Titles, which August Jackson and Sid Oakley under the 'Ring Crew Express' banner ended up winning.

2020-2021 
In early 2020, a new annual tournament was introduce called the Annual Embassy Bingo Cathays Invitational Classic. Connor Mills was crowned its first winner in a one night tournament on 25 January at the Cathays Community Centre (the venue of the building which the tournament was named after). It was also announced at this show that the Kris Travis Tag Team Invitational would also be making a return later in the year. Many of their live events would stop after their Road To Sacrifice show on 14 March due to the United Kingdom heavily enforcing the regulations due to the COVID-19 Pandemic halting the world's events which would last for several months, effectively cancelling their My Sacrfice IV show as well as other future planned shows.

As the Pandemic went on with no further content being created, it was announced that Attack! would essentially be closed around April 2021 due to Pete Dunne (one of the owners at the time) being unable to prioritise the promotion while working in the States and the pandemic was still ongoing.

Return in 2023 
On Saturday 21 January 2023 during what was initially booked as event called 'Mark Andrew's Super Secret Birthday Bash!', it was announced Attack! Pro Wrestling would be returning with Mark Andrews as a new owner and this show was actually the return event for the promotion.

Club One Hundred 
In July 2016, Attack! Pro Wrestling launched "Club One Hundred", a series of events with a limited number of tickets available. The purpose of the events is to showcase up-and-coming British wrestlers, alongside some of the more established names.

Working relationships 
Prior to 2020, Attack! Pro Wrestling had run shows in conjunction with Fight Club:Pro, Chikara and Dragon Pro Wrestling.

Final championships

Attack! Championship

Combined reigns 

{| class="wikitable sortable" style="text-align: center"
!Rank
!Wrestler
!No. ofreigns
!Combineddays
|-
!1
| Cara Noir || 1 || 402
|-
!2
| Flash Morgan Webster || 1 || 395
|-
!3
| Damian Dunne || 2 || 387
|-
!4
| M. Shay Ultra || 1 || 161
|-
!5
| Eddie Dennis || 2 || 124
|-
!6
| Wild Boar || 1 || 60
|-

Attack! 24:7 Championship 

The Attack! 24:7 Championship is a title currently won and defended in the Attack! Pro Wrestling promotion. The championship works under the 24/7 rule, very similar to other hardcore championships, which means it can be defended anytime, anywhere. During its existence, the title has been won by male, female wrestlers, by tag teams or even referees.

Combined reigns 

{| class="wikitable sortable" style="text-align: center"
!Rank
!Wrestler
!No. ofreigns
!Combineddays
|-
!1
| Pete Dunne || 6 || 964
|-
!2
| Nico Angelo || 1 || 405
|-
!3
| Jim Hunter || 2 || 134
|-
!4
| Musmortus || 1 || 129
|-
!5
| Chuck Mambo || 4 || 127
|-
!6
| Arthur Klauser-Saxon/Tyler Bate|| 4 || 111
|-
!7
| Skat Monkey || 1 || 102
|-
!8
| Wild Boar || 5 || 101
|-
!9
| Ryan Smile || 1 || 91
|-
!10
| Warren Owen || 4 || 85
|-
!11
| Shay Purser || 3 || 61
|-
!rowspan=2|12
| Eddie Dennis || 4 || 56
|-
| Cara Noir || 4 || 56
|-
!14
| Lee Hunter || 1 || 55
|-
!15
| Drew Parker || 2 || 48
|-
!16
| Robbie X || 4 || 37
|-
!17
| Nixon Newell || 3 || 28
|-
!18
| Damian Dunne || 5 || 17
|-
!19
| Lloyd Katt || 1 || 8
|-
!20
| Joey Ryan || 1 || 6
|-
!21
| Flash Morgan Webster || 1 || 5
|-
!22
| Mark Andrews || 5 || 2
|-
!23
| Ethan Silver/Kid Lykos || 2 || 1
|-
!24
| Kyle Fletcher || 4 || <1
|-
!rowspan=2|25
| Mark Davis || 3 || <1
|-
| Sebastian Radclaw || 3 || <1
|-
!rowspan=2|27
| Danny Jones/Nathan Daniels || 2 || <1
|-
| Mike Bailey || 2 || <1
|-
!rowspan=18|29
| Chris Roberts || 1 || <1
|-
| Clint Margera || 1 || <1
|-
| Daft Bump || 1 || <1
|-
| Dave Mastiff || 1 || <1
|-
| Dick Riley || 1 || <1
|-
| Everett || 1 || <1
|-
| Farmer Giles || 1 || <1
|-
| Jeff Cornell || 1 || <1
|-
| Jim Lee || 1 || <1
|-
| Joel Allen || 1 || <1 
|-
| Lana Austin || 1 || <1
|-
| Los Federales Santos Jr. || 1 || <1
|-
| Mike Bird || 1 || <1
|-
| Sam Bailey || 1 || <1
|-
| Sean Kustom || 1 || <1
|-
| Sid Oakley || 1 || <1
|-
| Travis Banks || 1 || <1
|-
| T-Bone || 1 || <1
|-

Attack! Tag Team Championship

Combined reigns 

{| class="wikitable sortable" style="text-align: center"
!Rank
!Team
!No. ofreigns
!Combineddays
|-
!1
| The 0121  || 2 || 549
|-
!2
| CCK || 4 || 332
|-
!3
| Aussie Open || 2 || 302
|-
!4
| Wonderland Of Wrestle || 1 || 268
|-
!5
| Bowl-A-Rama || 2 || 219
|-
!6
| The Hunter Brothers || 3 || 170
|-
!7
| Bayside High || 1 || 140
|-
!8
| Team White Wolf || 1 || 105
|-
!9
| Ring Crew Express  || 1 || 45
|-
!rowspan=2|10
| CCK || 1 || <1
|-
| Moustache Mountain || 1 || <1
|-

By wrestler 
{|class="wikitable sortable" style="text-align: center"
!Rank
!Wrestler
!data-sort-type="number"|No. ofreigns
!data-sort-type="number"|Combineddays	
|-
!1
| Dan Moloney/Super Santos Sr. || 3 || 817
|-
!2
| Man Like DeReiss || 2 || 549
|-
!rowspan=2|3
| Chris Brookes || 5 || 332
|-
| Kid Lykos || 4 || 332
|-
!rowspan=2|5
| Kyle Fletcher || 2 || 302
|-
| Mark Davis || 2 || 302
|-
!7
| Elephant Mask || 1 || 268
|-
!rowspan=2|8
| Lloyd Katt || 2 || 219
|-
| Split McPins || 2 || 219
|-
!rowspan=2|10
| Jim Hunter || 3 || 170
|-
| Lee Hunter || 3 || 170
|-
!rowspan=2|12
| Mark Andrews || 1 || 140
|-
| Nixon Newell || 1 || 140
|-
!rowspan=2|14
| A-Kid || 1 || 105
|-
| Adam Chase || 1 || 105
|-
!rowspan=2|16
| August Jackson || 1 || 45
|-
| Sid Oakley || 1 || 45
|-
!rowspan=3|18
| Kid Lykos II || 1 || <1
|-
| Trent Seven || 1 || <1
|-
| Tyler Bate || 1 || <1
|-

Attack! Pro Wrestling Triple Crown Champions 
While nothing is made official yet in terms of there being First Crown Champions within Attack! Pro Wrestling, there are three different championship belts current active in the promotion, and many performers over the years are one championship away from being crowned a Triple Crown Champion. Below is a brief table of those who are eligible to becoming Triple Crown Champions in alphabetical order.

Embassy Bingo Cathays Invitational Classic Tournament 
2020 winner: Connor Mills

Elder Stein Invitational Tournament 
2015 winner: Wild Boar
2013 winner: Sebastian Radclaw
2012 winner: Pete Dunne
2011 winner: Mark Andrews

Kris Travis Tag Team Invitational Tournament 
2018 winners: The Hunter Brothers (Jim Hunter & Lee Hunter)
2017 winners: Project Lucha (El Ligero & Martin Kirby)

References

External links
 Attack! Pro Wrestling official website

British professional wrestling promotions
2011 establishments in the United Kingdom